The Sims is a social simulation video game developed by Maxis and published by Electronic Arts in 2000. It is a simulation of the daily activities of one or more virtual people, called "Sims", in a suburban household near a fictional city. Players control customizable Sims as they pursue career and relationship goals. Players can also use their Sims' income to renovate their living space, and purchase home furnishings, or clothing for their household. Players can also choose to pursue a social and successful life.

The game's development was led by Will Wright and the game was a follow-up to Wright's earlier SimCity series; Wright was inspired to create the game by Christopher Alexander's 1977 book A Pattern Language, and Scott McCloud's 1993 book Understanding Comics later played a role in the game's design. Seven expansion packs were released from 2000 to 2003, each of which added new items, characters, skins, and features.

Upon release, The Sims garnered widespread critical acclaim and was described by Wright as being successful in attracting casual and female gamers. It also won several awards and placed 31st on Time's The 50 Best Video Games of All Time list. The game has also been commercially successful, being one of the  best-selling PC games of all time with 11.5 million copies sold. Several sequels were released—The Sims 2 in 2004, The Sims 3 in 2009, and The Sims 4 in 2014.

Gameplay
The structure of the game is an agent-based artificial life program. The presentation of the game's artificial intelligence is advanced, and the Sims will respond to outside conditions independently, though often the player's intervention is necessary to keep the Sims on the right track. The Sims technically has unlimited replay value, in that there is no way to truly win the game, and the player can play indefinitely. It has been described as more like a toy than a game.

Sims is influenced by the player to interact with objects or other Sims. Sims may receive guests at their home lot, invited or not, from other playable lots or from unhoused non-player character (NPC) Sims. If enabled in the game's options, Sims have a certain amount of free will, allowing them to autonomously interact with their world. However, the player can override most of these autonomous actions by canceling them in the action queue at the top of the screen. Unlike the simulated environments in games such as SimCity, SimEarth or SimLife, Sims are not fully autonomous. They are unable to take certain actions without specific commands, such as paying bills, finding a job, exercising, and conceiving children. Sims communicate in a fictional language called Simlish, which is mostly composed of blowing raspberries and saying nonsense.

The player can make decisions about time spent in skill development, such as exercise, reading, creativity, and logic by adding activities to Sims' daily agenda. Daily needs such as hygiene and eating can and must also be scheduled. Although Sims can autonomously perform these actions, they may not prioritize them effectively and can suffer consequences for neglecting their own needs. In addition, Sims must maintain balanced budgets and usually supplement an income by obtaining a job. Sims may earn promotions by fulfilling skills and maintaining friendships with others for each level, which lead to new job titles, increased wages, and different work hours. Alternatively, Sims may create and sell various artwork and items at home.

While there is no eventual objective to the game, states of failure do exist in The Sims. One is that Sims may die, either by starvation, drowning, fire, or electrocution (or from natural causes/age in certain versions). When a Sim dies, a tombstone or an urn will appear (in later expansion packs, the Grim Reaper will appear first), and the ghost of the deceased Sim may haunt the building where it died. In addition, Sims can leave the game for good and never return, or two adult Sims with a bad relationship may brawl, eventually resulting in one of them moving out. Children will be sent away to military school if they fail their classes or if they have not fulfilled their needs, a social care worker will take babies away from their household and they are no longer returnable.

Building tools
When the "Live" mode occurs in the game, the player may enter "Build" mode or "Buy" mode to pause time and renovate the house or lot. When the game begins, each family starts off with §20,000 simoleons (regardless of its number of members). These funds can be used to purchase a small house or vacant lot on the neighborhood screen. After purchasing a lot, a user may construct or remodel a house in Build mode or purchase or move furniture in Buy mode. All architectural and customizable features and furnishings in Build and Buy modes follow a square-tile system in which items must be placed on a tile. Walls and fences extend along the edge of a tile and can follow the edge of the tile or cross it diagonally, but furniture items cannot be placed on either side of a crossed tile. The base game contains over 150 items, including furniture and architectural elements.

In addition, the game includes an architecture system. The game was originally designed solely as an architecture simulator, with the Sims there only to evaluate the houses, but during development, it was decided that the Sims were more interesting than originally anticipated, and their once-limited role in the game was developed further.

Players have a broad choice of objects that their respective Sims may purchase. Objects fall into one of eight broad categories: seating, surfaces, decorations, electronics, appliances, plumbing, lighting, and miscellaneous.

Development

The original inspiration for The Sims was Christopher Alexander's 1977 book on architecture and urban design, A Pattern Language. Game designer Will Wright was inspired by the book's focus on functionality in architecture, as Alexander based his design principles on structural usability rather than aesthetic values. Wright wanted to create a simulation game about enabling human behavior and interaction through design. Scott McCloud's 1993 book Understanding Comics became a big influence on the design of The Sims later on, as it advocates a certain type of "collaboration" between designer and consumer and outlines the value of abstraction for getting readers or players involved with a story.

Will Wright started working on The Sims after releasing SimAnt in 1991. It was during that same year that he lost his home during the Oakland firestorm of 1991, and he incorporated his experience of rebuilding his life into the game. However, the game's concept was very poorly received by a focus group, so Wright had difficulty getting the project off the ground. He managed to convince his company to let him work on the project (codenamed "Project  X" at the time) in the background while developing SimCity 2000 and SimCopter. He was lent one programmer for the project, Jamie Doornbos, who went on to become the lead programmer for The Sims. During the first few years of the project, Wright and Doornbos were primarily developing an open-ended system of character behavior. As the project continued, Wright found that the social aspect of the game turned out to be highly engaging, and the team started to focus more on the characters of the game, such as by letting Sims visit one another's houses and by implementing long-term relationships.

Wright has mentioned playing Little Computer People and receiving valuable feedback on The Sims from several people involved with the game including its designer, Rich Gold.

A demo of the game was presented at the 1999 Electronic Entertainment Expo. During a displaying in front of the press, two female characters at an in-game wedding fell in love and kissed each other. After the event, the relationship mechanics were further modified so the character's sexual orientation was set depending on the player's actions.

The Sims uses a combination of 3D and 2D graphics techniques. The Sims themselves are rendered in 3D, whereas the house and all its objects are pre-rendered and displayed diametrically.

For the game's Japanese release, the game was renamed to SimPeople (シムピープル) to match the naming conventions of the other Sim games from Maxis.

Music
The game music was composed by Jerry Martin, Marc Russo, Kirk R. Casey, and Dix Bruce. The game disc contains 37 tracks, of which 15 were published in 2007 as an official soundtrack album. Most of the tracks contain no vocals, but some of them feature Simlish lyrics.

Modding scene
The Sims is credited with opening up modding to a new demographic, making it easy enough for "casual modders" to modify the game.  The Sims was designed in a way that it would be easy to add user-created content (also known as custom content or "CC") to the game, with Will Wright stating in an interview that he wanted to put the player in the design role. Maxis released modding tools for The Sims before the game itself, resulting in a suite of fan-created mods being available at launch. Websites for downloading CCs and mods include The Sims Resource and Mod The Sims.

Expansion packs

The Sims had a total of seven expansion packs released in its lifecycle. Each expansion generally adds new items, neighborhoods, characters, skins, and features.

Expansion compilations

Reception

Critical reception

On review aggregator GameRankings, the PC version of The Sims received a score of 89.75% based on 46 reviews. Will Wright, the game's designer, said the game has been a success in many ways—attracting casual gamers and female gamers (the latter making up almost 60% of players).

Jeff Lundrigan reviewed the PC version of the game for Next Generation, rating it four stars out of five, saying "Do not miss. Run do not walk. And set aside lots of time."

In 2012, the game was one of 14 video games selected by the Museum of Modern Art as the basis for an intended collection of 40 games.

Console ports
The PlayStation 2, Xbox and GameCube ports received scores ranging from 81.05% to 85.80% on GameRankings.

Awards
The Sims has won numerous awards, including GameSpot's "Game of the Year Award" for 2000. During the 3rd Annual AIAS Interactive Achievement Awards (now known as the D.I.C.E. Awards), The Sims won "Game of the Year", "Outstanding Achievement in Game Design" and "Outstanding Achievement in Gameplay Engineering" (along with nominations for "Computer Family Title of the Year" and "Outstanding Achievement in Art Direction"). Game Informer ranked it the 80th best game ever made in its 100th issue in 2001. In 2005, The Sims was inducted into GameSpot's list of the greatest games of all time. In 2016, The Strong National Museum of Play inducted The Sims to its World Video Game Hall of Fame. In August 2016, The Sims placed 31st on Time's The 50 Best Video Games of All Time list. In 2019, it was ranked 17th on The Guardian newspaper's The 50 Best Video Games of the 21st Century list.

Sales
The Sims was released on February 4, 2000, and became a best-seller shortly after launch. In the United States, it was the best-selling computer game of 2000, with domestic sales of 1.77 million units and revenues of $72.9 million. It remained the country's No. 1 computer title in 2001, when it sold an additional 1.48 million units and earned another $60.4 million in revenue. In 2002, The Sims became the top-selling PC game in history at the time, displacing Myst by selling more than 6.3 million copies worldwide.

By February 2005, the game had shipped 16 million copies worldwide. By July 2006, the console versions of The Sims series had sold a combined 3.5 million units in the United States.

Next Generation ranked The Sims as the 45th highest-selling game launched for the PlayStation 2, Xbox or GameCube between January 2000 and July 2006 in the United States.

As of March 2015, The Sims had sold more than 11.24 million copies for PC, making it one of the best-selling PC games of all time.

Sequels and legacy

The Sims was followed by the sequels The Sims 2 (2004), The Sims 3 (2009), and The Sims 4 (2014).

The console versions of The Sims were each followed by a sequel, The Sims Bustin' Out, and a spin-off game, The Urbz: Sims in the City. These versions incorporate some features of later PC expansion packs, and Bustin' Out adds a multiplayer mode supporting two simultaneous players.

See also

Simulated reality
Simulation

Notes

References

Further reading
 Atkins, Barry. More than a game: the computer Game as fictional form Manchester: Manchester Univ. Press, 2003.

External links

The Sims at MobyGames

2000 video games
AIAS Game of the Year winners
Aspyr games
Cancelled PlayStation (console) games
Electronic Arts games
GameCube games
Interactive Achievement Award winners
Life simulation games
Classic Mac OS games
PlayStation 2 games
Social simulation video games
The Sims
Video games featuring protagonists of selectable gender
Video games scored by Jerry Martin
Video games with alternative versions
Video games with expansion packs
Video games with isometric graphics
Video games with custom soundtrack support
Windows games
Xbox games
Video games about ghosts
Game Developers Choice Award for Game of the Year winners
World Video Game Hall of Fame
Video games developed in the United States